Kesabpur may refer to:
Kesabpur, Bangladesh
 Kesabpur, India